Proletarul ('Proletarian') was a newspaper published in Romania between July 29, 1928 to May 1, 1935. It was the central organ of the Socialist Workers Party of Romania, later merged into the United Socialist Party. Ștefan Voitec was the editor of the newspaper.

Publication of Proletarul was suspended by the Romanian government in August 1935.

References

1928 establishments in Romania
1935 disestablishments in Romania
Defunct newspapers published in Romania
Newspapers published in Romania
Publications established in 1928
Publications disestablished in 1935
Romanian-language newspapers
Socialist newspapers